Philipp Etter (21 December 1891, in Menzingen – 23 December 1977) was a Swiss politician. He was the son of Joseph Anton, cooper master, and the Jakobea Stocker.
During his office time he held the Department of Home Affairs and was President of the Confederation four times between 1939 and 1953. He was chosen for the Conservative People's Party in the Zug cantonal parliament.

By 1922 he had moved into the Executive Council, where he took over the education and Military Department. Between 1927 and 1928 he was Zugerland Ammann. In 1930 he was elected to the Senate. He was elected to the Federal Council of Switzerland on 28 March 1934 and handed over office on 31 December 1959. He was affiliated with the Christian Democratic People's Party of Switzerland. After the surprise resignation of Freiburg Federal Jean-Marie Musy the Federal Assembly elected the first 43 years of Zug conservatives on 28.03.1934 in the Bundesrat. Etter took over the Department of the Interior, which in its 25-year term - experienced an increasing importance - particularly through the development of the welfare state. 

In the prewar years Etter was instrumental in the development of the so-called "spiritual national defense". During World War II, he took a decidedly conservative, adaptable friendly policy toward Nazi Germany and a particularly considerate attitude towards Italy. In the phase of economic and social reconstruction after 1945 he was able to introduce new approaches. His political work was characterized by its central Swiss homeland and his Catholic-conservative world view which, among other things, was permeated by anti-Jewish and anti-Semitic stereotypes. Etter, who represented the idea of a Christian, corporatist authoritarian state, was one of the most important and most prominent political figures of Switzerland in the 20th century.

External links

Philipp Etter in History of Social Security in Switzerland

 

Members of the Federal Council (Switzerland)
Members of the Council of States (Switzerland)
World War II political leaders
1891 births
1977 deaths
People from the canton of Zug
Swiss Roman Catholics
Christian Democratic People's Party of Switzerland politicians
20th-century Swiss politicians